Hannam Station is a station on the Gyeongui-Jungang Line. It is located on the northwestern end of the Hannam Bridge, overlooking the Han River. It was also called Dankook University Station until 2007, when Dankook University moved the majority of its campus to the suburban city of Yongin.

The neighborhood of Hannam-dong is home to various nations' embassies in Korea, and many can be accessed from this station, with the closest being the embassy of Slovakia.

Station layout

External links
 Station information from Korail

Seoul Metropolitan Subway stations
Metro stations in Yongsan District
Railway stations opened in 1980